Maxine Kumin (June 6, 1925 – February 6, 2014) was an American poet and author. She was appointed Poet Laureate Consultant in Poetry to the Library of Congress in 1981–1982.

Biography

Early years
Maxine Kumin was born Maxine Winokur on June 6, 1925 in Philadelphia, the daughter of Jewish parents, and attended a Catholic kindergarten and primary school. She received her B.A. in 1946 and her M.A. in 1948 from Radcliffe College. In June 1946 she married Victor Kumin, an engineering consultant; they had three children, two daughters and a son. In 1957, she studied poetry with John Holmes at the Boston Center for Adult Education. There she met Anne Sexton, with whom she started a friendship that continued until Sexton's suicide in 1974. Kumin taught English from 1958 to 1961 and 1965 to 1968 at Tufts University; from 1961 to 1963 she was a scholar at the Radcliffe Institute for Independent Study. She also held appointments as a visiting lecturer and poet in residence at many American colleges and universities. From 1976 until her death in February 2014, she and her husband lived on a farm in Warner, New Hampshire, where they bred Arabian and quarter horses.

Career
Kumin's many awards include the Eunice Tietjens Memorial Prize for Poetry (1972), the Pulitzer Prize for Poetry (1973) for Up Country, in 1995 the Aiken Taylor Award for Modern American Poetry, the 1994 Poets' Prize (for Looking for Luck), an American Academy and Institute of Arts and Letters Award for excellence in literature (1980), an Academy of American Poets fellowship (1986), the 1999 Ruth Lilly Poetry Prize, and six honorary degrees. In 1979, the Supersisters trading card set was produced and distributed; one of the cards featured Kumin's name and picture. She was also awarded the Sarah Joseph Hale Award and the Levinson Prize. She has also received a National Endowment for the Arts grant and fellowships from the Academy of American Poets. In 1981–1982, she served as the poetry consultant to the Library of Congress.  Kumin has been published in Beloit Poetry Journal.

Critics have compared Kumin with Elizabeth Bishop because of her meticulous observations and with Robert Frost, for she frequently devotes her attention to the rhythms of life in rural New England. She has been grouped with confessional poets such as Anne Sexton, Sylvia Plath and Robert Lowell. But unlike the confessionalists, Kumin eschews high rhetoric and adopts a plain style. Throughout her career, Kumin has struck a balance between her sense of life's transience and her fascination with the dense physical presence of the world around her. She served as the 1985 judge of the Brittingham Prize in Poetry and she selected Patricia Dobler's Talking To Strangers.

She taught poetry in New England College's Low-Residency MFA Program. She was also a contributing editor at The Alaska Quarterly Review. Together with fellow-poet Carolyn Kizer, she first served on and then resigned from the board of chancellors of the Academy of American Poets, an act that galvanized the movement for opening this august body to broader representation by women and minorities.

Kumin, aged 88, died in February 2014 at her home in Warner, following a year of failing health.

Kumin is believed to be the last person to have seen Anne Sexton alive, as the two of them had had lunch the day of Sexton's suicide in 1974.

Bibliography

Poetry

Collections

The Privilege, Harper & Row, 1965
The Nightmare Factory, Harper & Row, 1970
The Abduction, Harper & Row, 1971, 
Up Country, Harper & Row, 1972 (illustrated by Barbara Swan)
House, Bridge, Fountain, Gate, Viking/Penguin, 1975, 
The Retrieval System, Viking/Penguin, 1978, 
Our Ground Time Here Will Be Brief, New and Selected Poems, Viking/Penguin 1982, 
The Long Approach, Viking/Penguin, 1985–6, 
Nurture, Viking/Penguin 1989, 
Looking for Luck, W. W. Norton, 1992, 
Connecting the Dots, W. W. Norton, 1996, 
Selected Poems 1960–1990, W. W. Norton, 1997, cloth; paper; New York Times notable book of the year
 cloth, paper; finalist for the Lenore Marshall Award of the Academy of American Poets, 2002
Bringing Together: Uncollected Early Poems 1958–1988, W. W. Norton, 2003, 
Jack and Other New Poems, W. W. Norton, 2005, 

And Short the Season, W. W. Norton, 2014,

List of poems

Novels
Through Dooms of Love, Harper & Row, 1965; Hamish Hamilton & Gollancz (England), Panther paper
The Passions of Uxport, Harper & Row, 1968, Dell paper, 1969
The Abduction, Harper & Row, 1971
The Designated Heir, Viking, 1974; Andre Deutsch (England)
Quit Monks or Die (animal rights mystery), Story Line Press, 1999,

Essays and short story collections
To Make a Prairie: Essays on Poets, Poetry and Country Living, University of Michigan Press, 1980  paper
Why Can't We Live Together Like Civilized Human Beings? Viking  1982
In Deep: Country Essays, Viking 1987, ; Beacon Press 1988
Women, Animals, and Vegetables: Essays and Stories, Norton, 1994; Ontario Review Press, paper, 1996
Telling the Barn Swallow: Poets on the Poetry of Maxine Kumin, ed. by Emily Grosholz, University Press of New England, 1997
Always Beginning: Essays on a Life in Poetry, Copper Canyon Press, 2000,

Children's books
 1961 Follow the Fall (Illustrated by Artur Marokvia)
 1961 Spring Things (Illustrated by Artur Marokvia)
 1961 Summer Story (Illustrated by Artur Marokvia)
 1961 A Winter Friend (Illustrated by Artur Marokvia)
 1962 Mittens in May (Illustrated by Elliott Gilbert)
 1964 Sebastian and the Dragon (Illustrated by William D. Hayes)
 1964 Speedy Digs Downside Up (Illustrated by Ezra Jack Keats)
 1967 Faraway Farm (Illustrated by Kurt Werth)
 1969 When Grandmother Was Young (Illustrated by Don Almquist)
 1971 When Great-Grandmother Was Young (Illustrated by Don Almquist)
 1984 The Microscope (Illustrated by Arnold Lobel), Harper & Row, 1984, 
 2006 Mites to Mastodons (Illustrated by Pam Zagarenski)
 
 2011 Oh, Harry! (Illustrated by Barry Moser)
co-written with Anne Sexton
1963 Eggs of Things (Illustrated by Leonard Shortall)
1964 More Eggs of Things (Illustrated by Leonard Shortall)
1974 Joey and the Birthday Present (Illustrated by Evaline Ness)
1975 The Wizard's Tears (Illustrated by Evaline Ness)

Memoirs
The Pawnbroker's Daughter, W. W. Norton, July 2015,

References

External links

Encyclopædia Britannica profile
Kumin profile at the Poetry Foundation
Kumin's Academy Of American Poets' page
Kumin profile and poems written and audio, Poetry Archive
Maxine Kumin: a reading from the 2010 Key West Literary Seminar (15:45)
 Kumin at American Modern Poetry
Christian Science Monitor interview
Maxine Kumin's Official Web Site
Maxine Kumin and Wesley McNair Poems read by the authors in a 75-minute video from the U.S. Library of Congress.
 Audio: Maxine Kumin reads "Looking Back in my Eighty-First Year" from the book Still to mow (via poemsoutloud.net)
 Maxine Kumin Papers. Yale Collection of American Literature, Beinecke Rare Book and Manuscript Library.

1925 births
2014 deaths
American children's writers
American women novelists
American women poets
American Poets Laureate
Jewish American novelists
Jewish American poets
Jewish women writers
People from Warner, New Hampshire
Pulitzer Prize for Poetry winners
Radcliffe College alumni
Tufts University faculty
Poets from New Hampshire
Writers from Philadelphia
20th-century American novelists
American women children's writers
20th-century American women writers
20th-century American poets
The New Yorker people
Novelists from Pennsylvania
Novelists from Massachusetts
American women academics
21st-century American Jews
21st-century American women